Binga is a town in Mongala province of Democratic Republic of the Congo. In 2010 it had an estimated population of 64,639.

Binga is served by Binga Airport.

Deforestation has affected the area.

References

Populated places in Mongala